Madeleine Cotty (26 August 1884 – 26 February 1929) was a French painter. His work was part of the painting event in the art competition at the 1924 Summer Olympics.

References

1884 births
1929 deaths
19th-century French painters
20th-century French painters
French male painters
Olympic competitors in art competitions
Painters from Paris
19th-century French male artists